Guido Cervo (born 1952) is an Italian writer. He debuted as novelist in 2002 with Il legato romano, set in the Roman Gaul during the 3rd century. This was followed by La legione invincibile and L'onore di Roma, both featuring the same characters, including historical ones. Also set in the Roman Empire age are Il centurione di Augusto, Il segno di Attila, Le mura di Adrianopoli, and L'aquila sul Nilo.

He lives in Bergamo, where he teaches Political Economics.

References

External links 
Biography at Edizione Piemme

1952 births
Living people
Italian male writers